"Hellmouth" is a 2019-2020 comic book event published by Boom! Studios. The event is a crossover between Buffy the Vampire Slayer and Angel, with both comics being overseen by Joss Whedon.

Premise 
As the Hellmouth threatens Sunnydale to the brink of extinction, Buffy Summers must join forces with the vampire Angel to save the city, as long as they do not kill each other.

Checklist

See also 
 List of Buffyverse comics
 Buffy the Vampire Slayer comics
 List of Angel comics
 Whedonverse (comics)

References 

2019 comics debuts
2020 comics endings
Boom! Studios titles
Buffyverse comic book crossovers
Storylines in comics
Angel (1999 TV series)
Buffy the Vampire Slayer